Sir Thomas McClure, 1st Baronet,  (4 March 1806 – 21 January 1893) was an MP for Belfast from 1868 to 1874. MP for Londonderry County 1878–1885.

He was appointed High Sheriff of Down for 1864 and later served as vice-lieutenant of the county.

McClure was created a baronet, of Belmont, County Down, on 20 March 1874. This title became extinct on his death.  Belmont, his home – bought from Lord Ranfurley – stood on the site of Campbell College.

Married Dreghorn Castle, Colinton, Scotland 18 October 1877 Ellison Thorburn Macfie 1842–1906.

References

External links 
 

1806 births
1893 deaths
Baronets in the Baronetage of the United Kingdom
UK MPs 1868–1874
UK MPs 1874–1880
UK MPs 1880–1885
Deputy Lieutenants of Down
High Sheriffs of Down
Irish Presbyterians
Members of the Parliament of the United Kingdom for Belfast constituencies (1801–1922)
Members of the Parliament of the United Kingdom for County Londonderry constituencies (1801–1922)